Miss Earth 2022 was the 22nd Miss Earth pageant, held on November 29, 2022 at the Okada Manila in Parañaque, Metro Manila, Philippines.

Destiny Wagner of Belize crowned Mina Sue Choi of South Korea as her successor at the end of the event. This is the first time South Korea won the Miss Earth pageant, one of the Big Four international beauty pageants. In the same event, her elemental court are crowned: Sheridan Mortlock of Australia as Miss Earth – Air, Nadeen Ayoub of Palestine as Miss Earth – Water, and Andrea Aguilera of Colombia as Miss Earth – Fire.

The competition returned to the Philippines into a standard format for the first time since 2019, after easing travel restrictions surrounding the COVID-19 pandemic.

The pageant was hosted by James Deakin for the sixth consecutive time and anchored by Miss Earth 2015 Angelia Ong, Miss Earth 2017 Karen Ibasco and Miss Earth 2019 Nellys Pimentel.

Background

Location and date 
The Swimsuit competition was held in Zamboanga City on November 16 and the grand coronation night on November 29, 2022, which were announced during the virtual competitions.

Selection of participants 
Contestants from 86 countries and territories were selected to compete in the pageant. Fourteen of these delegates were appointees to their national titles after being a runner-up of their national pageant or being selected through a casting process, while four were selected to replace the original dethroned winner.

Eunike Suwandi, Putri Bumi Indonesia 2021, was originally scheduled to represent Indonesia in the competition. However, Putri Bumi Indonesia lost the franchise to the Mahakarya Duta Pesona Indonesia Organization, who is now in charge of selecting a representative to Miss Earth. Karina Basrewan was appointed to represent Miss Earth through a closed-door selection process. Brielle Simmons, the second runner-up of Miss Earth USA 2022, was appointed to represent the United States after Natalia Salmon, lost the title for unknown reasons. Elizabeth Gasiba, Miss Earth Venezuela 2022, was replaced by Oriana Pablos, third runner-up of Miss Venezuela 2019, due to academic reasons. Chileshe Wakumelo, Miss Earth Zambia 2022, has already competed in some preliminary activities but withdrew due to undisclosed reasons. She was replaced by the first runner-up of Miss Earth Zambia 2019, Joyce Mwansa.

The 2022 edition will see the debuts of Burundi, Cabo Verde, and Senegal, and the returns of Albania, Croatia, the Democratic Republic of the Congo, Ecuador, Ethiopia, Haiti, Hong Kong, Iraq, Kosovo, Malta, Mongolia, Namibia, Pakistan, Palestine, Poland, Romania, Scotland, Sierra Leone, Slovakia, South Korea, South Sudan, Wales, and Zambia. Hong Kong last competed in 2011, Albania in 2013, the Democratic Republic of the Congo, Kosovo, and Scotland in 2015, Iraq, Namibia, and Palestine in 2016, Ethiopia and Wales in 2017, Haiti, South Korea, Malta, Slovakia, and South Sudan in 2019, and the others in 2020.

Results

 Miss Earth
 Miss Earth – Air
 Miss Earth – Water
 Miss Earth – Fire
 Top 8
 Top 12
 Top 20

Placements

Special Awards

Other Awards

Pre-pageant activities

Virtual pre-pageant activities
Miss Earth's virtual pre-pageant activities premiered on Miss Earth's official YouTube channel on 25 October 2022 with the Meet the delegates series. Six competitions took place: Fauna outfit competition, Intelligence preliminary judging, National costume competition, Beauty of Face, Fitness & Form, and the Eco Video presentations.

Delegates were divided into four regions; Asia & Oceania, Europe, Africa and the Americas for Intelligence preliminary judging between November 1 and 4, 2022. For the first time, the Fauna outfit competition was held, which displayed the delegates' creative outfits of the fauna they represent. The grand showcase of the delegates' culture and traditions in the National Costume competition premiered on 6 November 2022. Other preliminary rounds include Miss Earth 2022 Beauty of Face competition and the Miss Earth 2022 Fitness & Form. The Miss Earth 2022 Eco Video presentation divided the delegates via the continental group between November 11 and 14.

Press Presentation
86 delegates were introduced during the Miss Earth 2022 press presentation, held at Okada Manila on November 14, 2022.

Swimsuit Competition
The swimsuit competition was held at the Azzura Beach Resort in Zamboanga City on November 16, 2022. The competition was won by Esther Ajayi of Nigeria, Andrea Aguilera of Colombia, Mina Sue Choi of South Korea, and Liliya Levaya of Belarus.

Beach Wear Competition 
The Beach Wear Competition was held in various places in the Philippines from November 18 to 19, 2022. The competition was won by Mina Sue Choi of South Korea, Daniela Riquelme of Chile, Andrea Aguilera of Colombia, and Jessica Pedroso of Brazil.

Long Gown Competition

Resort Wear Competition

Talent Competition

Judges
Theresa Mundita Lim – Executive Director of ASEAN Centre for Biodiversity
Daphne Oseña-Paez – TV Host & Presentor, Host
Abhisek Gupta – Managing Director of Mindshare Philippines
Thuy Bui – Senior Country Officer International Finance Cooperation World Bank Group
Roel Refran – CEO of Philippines Stock Exchange
Lorraine Schuck – Founder and Executive Vice President of Miss Earth Organization

Contestants
86 contestants competed for the title.

Notes

References

External links
 

2022
Earth 2022
2022 in the Philippines